Hakim Rawther, known mononymously as Hakim, was an Indian actor and film maker in Malayalam cinema. He was known for his directional debut The Guard (2001), which is the world's first film with only a single actor in the cast. He had also acted in supporting roles in several Malayalam movies.

Biography
Hakim was from Kottayam, Kerala. Before entering cinema, he was a mimicry artist. He was one of the first members of Cochin Kalabhavan. He accompanied singer K. J. Yesudas as a session mimicry artist during the period 1979-89. He has been a common face in Jayaraj's films. He has also acted in supporting roles with many other directors. He debuted as a director with The Guard (2001), which was the world's first film with only an actor on screen.

Personal life
Hakim was married to Ghazal writer and singer Devi Menon. The couple did not have any children. He died of cerebral hemmorage on 5 September 2013 at Kottayam, aged 58.

Filmography

As director
The Guard (2001) starring Kalabhavan Mani

As actor
Mookkillarajyathu (1991) as Mental hospital patient
Johnnie Walker (1992) as Drug mafia member
Paithrukam (1993) as atheistic society member
Njan Kodiswaran (1994) as Mental hospital patient
Arabia (film) (1995) as Usthad
Manthramothiram (1997) as Thief
Indriyam (2000)
Thilakkam (2003)
Pattanathil Sundaran (2003) as Sundaresan's friend
Vettam (2004) as man at tea shop
Kaazhcha (2004) as man at film club society
Rasikan (2004) as Mari, beggar in the street
Kisan  (2006) as Velichapaadu
Orma Mathram (2011) as man at orphanage
Naayika (2011) as the camera man

References

External links

Hakim at arabia365.com
Hakim at arabianewspaper.com
Hakim at Oneindia.in
Interview with Hakim - Part 1
Interview with Hakim - Part 2
Interview with Hakim - Part 3

2013 deaths
20th-century Indian male actors
21st-century Indian male actors
Film directors from Kerala
Indian male film actors
Malayalam film directors
Male actors from Kottayam
Male actors in Malayalam cinema
Year of birth missing